HMAS Hunter (FFG) is the lead ship of the Hunter-class frigate of the Royal Australian Navy.

Development and design 

The Hunter-class frigate is a future class of frigates for the Royal Australian Navy (RAN) to replace the Anzac-class. Construction is expected to begin in 2020, with the first of nine vessels to enter service in the late 2020s. The Program is expected to cost AU$35 billion and a request for tender was released in March 2017 to three contenders: Navantia, Fincantieri, and BAE Systems as part of a competitive evaluation process.

The Hunter-class frigate will be an Australian variation of the Type 26 class frigate that is to be operated by the Royal Navy from the mid-2020s.

Construction and career 
Hunter was ordered on 30 June 2018 and named after Vice Admiral John Hunter. She will be built by BAE Systems Australia in Osborne. First steel was cut on prototype blocks in December 2021. This is to be followed in 2023 with first steel being cut on blocks that will actually be used in ships of the class. The ship is expected to be laid down in 2023 or later and commissioned in 2031.

References 

Frigates
Hunter-class frigates